IFK Växjö is a sports club in Växjö, Sweden, established on 2 July 1919. The club runs track and field athletics and disabled sports, earlier even bandy and football. The men's bandy team played in the Swedish top division in 1941. The women's football activity was transferred to Östers IF in 1983, leading to the establishments of Östers IF dam.

Track and field athlete Carolina Klüft and singer John Lundvik have competed for the club.

References

External links
Official website 

IFK Vaxjo
Defunct bandy clubs in Sweden
Defunct football clubs in Sweden
IFK Vaxjo
IFK Vaxjo
Sports clubs established in 1919
Association football clubs established in 1919
Bandy clubs established in 1919
Idrottsföreningen Kamraterna